Where My Heart Belongs is a studio album by American singer Gladys Knight. It was released by Shadow Mountain Records on September 9, 2014 in the United States.

Track listing

Charts

Release history

References 

Gladys Knight albums
2014 albums